Lukáš Kryštůfek (born 15 August 1992) is a Czech footballer defender, who currently plays for FC Zbrojovka Brno.

References

External links
 

1992 births
Living people
Czech footballers
Czech First League players
FC Vysočina Jihlava players
FC Zbrojovka Brno players
Association football defenders
FC Sellier & Bellot Vlašim players
Czech National Football League players
People from Humpolec
Sportspeople from the Vysočina Region